Cereal Milk is a flavor, beverage, and ingredient introduced commercially by Christina Tosi in 2006 while working at Momofuku. Cereal Milk is milk flavored with breakfast cereal. A 15th-century Scottish recipe is the earliest known similar dish.

Historical antecedents 
According to The Atlantic, a 15th century Scottish recipe for brose or athol brose, which it described as similar to a liquid cranachan, calls for soaking oats in water and adding honey, Scotch, and, depending on the recipe, cream.

Development 
Tosi first created Cereal Milk in 2006 as an ingredient while working for David Chang at Momofoku. There were no desserts on the menu when Tosi came on board, and she created her own recipes inspired by the flavors of childhood favorites, including Cereal Milk panna cotta.  The Los Angeles Times described Tosi's take on panna cotta as "[taking] something upscale...and [yanking] it down. Tosi further developed the concept at Momofuku Bakery and Milk Bar, now Milk Bar. In addition to the panna cotta Tosi has developed an ice cream, cookies, a Charlotte, and beverages such as milk, lattes, and milkshakes. The basic ingredient is also used as a mixer for coffees and cocktails.

When Tosi opened Milk Bar, one of the first menu items was her Cereal Milk softserve. Tosi has since expanded to packaged custard-style ice cream in Cereal Milk flavors.

Preparation and ingredients 
The beverage and basic ingredient Cereal Milk is prepared by toasting cornflakes, steeping them at room temperature in milk, draining off the cereal, and adding brown sugar and salt. Other cereals can also be used.

Reception 
According to the New York Times, "Nothing bears the trademark of the pastry chef Christina Tosi more than her cereal milk flavor," and that she had made it a "household name". Axios called Cereal Milk a "cult favorite". Trade journal Restaurant Business called Tosi's cereal milk "iconic".

Saveur's Megan Zhang theorized that the appeal of the cereal milk flavor was rooted in the nostalgia of recalling that breakfast cereal was 'the first thing many of us learned to “cook” and eat ourselves as youngsters'.

Influence 
In 2017 Ben & Jerry's introduced a line of flavors that Eater called a [blatant ripoff] of Tosi's creation. Burger King produced a Cereal Milk milkshake.

References 

Cuisine
Drinks
Flavored milk